LazPaint is a free and open-source cross-platform lightweight image editor with raster and vectorial layers created with Lazarus. The software aims at being simpler than GIMP, is an alternative to Paint.NET and is also similar to Paintbrush.

Rendering is done with antialiasing and gamma correction. It can read/write usual image formats and interoperate with other layered editors via OpenRaster format. It also imports Paint.NET files (with their layer structure) and Photoshop files (as flattened images). Also, it can import 3d objects in Wavefront (.obj) format. There are complex selection functions, various filters and rendering of textures.

Colorspace 
Colors are stored in sRGB colorspace but drawing functions take into account gamma correction. There are many color manipulation functions such as shifting colors and colorizing. Since version 6, there is a curve adjustments function on RGBA channels and according to a corrected HSL colorspace. This correction takes into account the gamma factor and also perceived lightness according to the hue.

Vector shapes
Since version 7, shapes are stored with vectorial information. Thus they are editable after they have been drawn and are rendered again in case of layer transform. Layers are converted when needed to raster or vector. If a tool like the pen is applied, the layer is rasterized and vectorial information becomes unavailable.

Filling can be a solid color, a gradient or a texture. It can apply to simple shapes, complex curves, text and shaded shapes.

Releases

Notes

References

External links
 
 
 2011 poll on linuxquestions.org (7th place out of 13 linux graphics application)
 Chip magazine in Russian mentioning version 6.0

Raster graphics editors
Graphics
Photo software
Graphics software
Cross-platform_free_software
Cross-platform_software
Free_graphics_software
Free_multilingual_software
Free_raster_graphics_editors
Portable_software
Software_using_the_GPL_license
Pascal (programming language) software
Free software programmed in Pascal